Leptosia alcesta, the African wood white or flip flop, is a butterfly of the family Pieridae, found in Africa.

The wingspan is 30–40 mm in males and 35–42 mm in females. The adults fly year-round, peaking from March to May.

The larvae feed on Ritchiea species, Capparis fascicularis, and Capparis brassii.

Subspecies
L. a. alcesta (Senegal, Gambia, Guinea-Bissau, Guinea, Liberia, Ivory Coast, Ghana, Togo, Benin, Nigeria, Cameroon, Equatorial Guinea, Gabon, Congo, Central African Republic, Angola, Democratic Republic of the Congo)
L. a. inalcesta Bernardi, 1959 (Uganda, southern Sudan, Ethiopia, Democratic Republic of the Congo, Kenya, Tanzania, Zambia, Mozambique, eastern Zimbabwe, South Africa, Swaziland)
L. a. pseudonuptilla Bernardi, 1959 (Democratic Republic of the Congo to Ethiopia)
L. a. sylvicola (Boisduval, 1833) (Madagascar)

References

External links
Seitz, A. Die Gross-Schmetterlinge der Erde 13: Die Afrikanischen Tagfalter. Plate XIII 10

alcesta
Butterflies of Africa
Butterflies described in 1782
Taxa named by Caspar Stoll